Aillant may refer to several communes in France:
 Aillant-sur-Milleron, in the Loiret department
 Aillant-sur-Tholon, in the Yonne department